Nick Adams (born Nicholas Adamopoulos; September 5, 1984) is an Australian-born American conservative political commentator and author.

Adams came to public attention on March 3, 2017, when Donald Trump made favorable comments and tweets about his work, notably a tweet promoting Adams' book Green Card Warrior and a second tweet on August 25, 2017, promoting his book Retaking America.

Early life and education
Adams was born in Sydney, Australia to a Greek Australian father and a German Australian mother. Adams survived stage IV neuroblastoma diagnosed at 16 months of age. Adams attended Trinity Grammar School and went on to attend the University of Sydney where he graduated with a Bachelor of Media and Communications.

Political career
Adams was elected to the Municipality of Ashfield council in 2004 on the Liberal Party's ticket. At age 21, he was elected as deputy mayor. He was elected under a loophole which allowed Adams as a non-resident to run for elections. In 2005, as Deputy Mayor, Adams put forward a motion to ban pigeons from the Municipality of Ashfield due to fears of the bird flu, but failed to explain how this plan would be implemented. He was criticized for often missing council meetings because he was traveling the American speaking circuit as a motivational speaker. In October 2006, Adams was "formally condemned by fellow Councillors after racking up thousands of dollars worth of phone calls and Cabcharges for personal benefit."

As a member of the Ashfield council, Adams denounced multiculturalism, saying "It creates groups and pockets of people that of course, then feel that there are certain elements of superiority and inferiority and I think that we need to be united."

In 2009, he was given a six-month suspension from the  Liberal Party of Australia for conduct deemed likely to "embarrass or cause damage to" the Party during an altercation with Brett Mason, a journalist for  Channel Ten. Mason was filming a report on Adams' absences from the council due to overseas travel when Adams confronted him, stating, "I would just like to say that Brett Mason is a [expletive] good-for-nothing [expletive]. Thank you."

President Donald Trump appointed Adams, in 2020, to the Board of the Woodrow Wilson International Center for Scholars.

Political activism

Adams first visited the United States in 2009 as part of a speaking tour.

In 2010, Adams was the PR consultant for The Halloween Institute, a march to make Halloween a public holiday in Australia. It was later revealed those who protested were paid actors.

Adams immigrated to the United States in 2012. He said that he immigrated to America because "I love guns, hot dogs, chicken fried steak, barbecue, cheerleaders, American football, small town parades, beauty pageants, pick-up trucks, muscle cars and 16-lane freeways lined with supersized American flags." He has said that since he held conservative views that he had to wait nearly five years to acquire citizenship because of discrimination by the Obama administration. Adams works as a motivational speaker and conservative activist. He has said that his fascination of the American political system lead him to promoting American ideals. Then-Texas Governor Rick Perry crowned Adams an "honorary Texan" prior to a speech in 2013.

In 2016, Adams founded a non-profit Foundation for Liberty and American Greatness (FLAG) that promotes American exceptionalism at schools. Adams, in conjunction with FLAG and former interns for Antonin Scalia, have produced and distributed kid-friendly versions of the American constitution that promote constitutional rights and originalism.

He was a surrogate for the Donald Trump's 2020 presidential campaign. After the 2020 election, Adams promoted the false claim that the 2020 presidential election was stolen from Donald Trump.

In addition to appearing on Fox News and other conservative media outlets, Adams has been a columnist for Townhall and a "Centennial Institute Policy Fellow" at Colorado Christian University.

Political views
Adams opposes education regarding LGBTQ topics in schools and said that only a "bad parent" would take their children to see a drag queen show. LGBTQ Nation, an online news magazine, has alleged Adam's apparent hypocrisy on this topic as he has suggested taking children to Hooters.

Rhetorical style
Adams is known for his use of social media and has been described as a "Twitter troll." On Twitter, he has described himself as a "wildly successful alpha male", claimed that Donald Trump has "a better backhand than Roger Federer" and said "raise your children to be like Kid Rock and Kyle Rittenhouse, NOT Taylor Swift and Harry Styles!"

Luke Winkie writing for Slate said beginning in 2022, "I and a great number of other people outside of [Adams'] target demographic have noticed a fascinating shift in Adams’ Twitter verbiage—one that reveals the faintest hint that maybe, just maybe, this has all been a bit." Winkie stated he came to this conclusion after seeing Adam's obsessive tweets about Hooters, as well as his tweets regarding having a "foursome with the boys" (Adams contests that the foursome is in regards to golfing partners).

Described as "a mystery that nobody can solve", Luke Winkie hypothesizes that Adams is actually a far-right Republican, but as the popularity of Donald Trump has declined, Adams has found it beneficial to be a "weird, self-reflexive, tongue-in-cheek interpretation of [Trumpism]." Adams also sells "Alpha Male" branded merchandise including hats, shirts and mugs, which may reveal that profit is behind Adam's alleged routine.

Know Your Meme includes Adams as one of their internet celebrities. They have described Adams as espousing conservative talking points in a way that many view as "exaggerated and over-the-top...leading some to believe he is not being completely sincere." Know Your Meme points out, for example, that Adams blamed the Republicans poor performance in the 2022 United States midterm elections on not enough members of Gen Z, who voted, eating at Hooters while growing up. Additionally, they note that Adams was widely mocked after criticizing Rihanna's performance at the Super Bowl LVII Halftime Show and saying that country music artists Ted Nugent, Kid Rock and Lee Greenwood would have had a better performance. He has also described Jason Aldean, Wayne Newton and the University of Tennessee's Pride of the Southland Band as some of the top-10 current musicians in the United States.

Bibliography

References 

1984 births
Living people
Australian expatriates in the United States
Australian people of Greek descent
Place of birth missing (living people)
Deputy mayors of places in Australia
Internet trolls
Conservatism in Australia
Conservatism in the United States
American political commentators
Critics of multiculturalism